Nezumia is a genus of rattails. The generic name derives from the Japanese 鼠 (nezumi), meaning "mouse".

Species
There are currently 53 recognized species in this genus:
 Nezumia aequalis (Günther, 1878) (Common Atlantic grenadier)
 Nezumia africana (Iwamoto, 1970)
 Nezumia aspidentata Iwamoto & Merrett, 1997
 Nezumia atlantica (A. E. Parr, 1946) (Western Atlantic grenadier)
 Nezumia bairdii (Goode & T. H. Bean, 1877) (Marlin-spike grenadier)
 Nezumia brevibarbata (Barnard, 1925) (Short-beard grenadier)
 Nezumia brevirostris (Alcock, 1889)
 Nezumia burragei (C. H. Gilbert, 1905)
 Nezumia cliveri Iwamoto & Merrett, 1997
 Nezumia coheni Iwamoto & Merrett, 1997 (Cohen's whiptail)
 Nezumia condylura D. S. Jordan & C. H. Gilbert, 1904 (Japanese pugnose grenadier)
 Nezumia convergens (Garman, 1899) (Peruvian grenadier)
 Nezumia cyrano N. B. Marshall & Iwamoto, 1973
 Nezumia darus (C. H. Gilbert & C. L. Hubbs, 1916)
 Nezumia duodecim Iwamoto, 1970 (Twelve-rayed grenadier)
 Nezumia ectenes (C. H. Gilbert & Cramer, 1897)
 Nezumia evides (C. H. Gilbert & C. L. Hubbs, 1920)
 Nezumia holocentra (C. H. Gilbert & Cramer, 1897)
 Nezumia infranudis (C. H. Gilbert & C. L. Hubbs, 1920) 
 Nezumia investigatoris (Alcock, 1888)
 Nezumia kamoharai Okamura, 1970
 Nezumia kapala Iwamoto & A. Williams, 1999 (Kapala whiptail)
 Nezumia kensmithi R. R. Wilson, 2001 (Blunt-nosed whiptail)
 Nezumia latirostrata (Garman, 1899) (Broad-snout grenadier)
 Nezumia leucoura Iwamoto & A. Williams, 1999 (White-tail whiptail)
 Nezumia liolepis (C. H. Gilbert, 1890) (Smooth grenadier)
 Nezumia longebarbata (Roule & Angel, 1933) (Blunt-nose grenadier)
 Nezumia loricata (Garman, 1899) (Parrot grenadier)
 Nezumia merretti Iwamoto & A. Williams, 1999 (Merrett's whiptail)
 Nezumia micronychodon Iwamoto, 1970 (Small-tooth grenadier)
 Nezumia milleri Iwamoto, 1973 (Miller's grenadier)
 Nezumia namatahi McCann & D. G. McKnight, 1980 (Squashed-face rattail)
 Nezumia obliquata (C. H. Gilbert, 1905)
 Nezumia orbitalis (Garman, 1899) (Spectacled grenadier)
 Nezumia parini C. L. Hubbs & Iwamoto, 1977 (Parin's grenadier)
 Nezumia polylepis (Alcock, 1889)
 Nezumia propinqua (C. H. Gilbert & Cramer, 1897) (Aloha grenadier)
 Nezumia proxima (H. M. Smith & Radcliffe, 1912) (Short-tail grenadier)
 Nezumia pudens C. H. Gilbert & W. F. Thompson, 1916 (Atacama grenadier)
 Nezumia pulchella (Pequeño, 1971) (Thumb grenadier)
 Nezumia sclerorhynchus (Valenciennes, 1838) (Rough-tip grenadier)
 Nezumia semiquincunciata (Alcock, 1889)
 Nezumia shinoharai Nakayama & Endo, 2012 
 Nezumia soela Iwamoto & A. Williams, 1999 (Soela whiptail)
 Nezumia spinosa (C. H. Gilbert & C. L. Hubbs, 1916) (Saw-spine whiptail)
 Nezumia stelgidolepis (C. H. Gilbert, 1890) (California grenadier)
 Nezumia suilla N. B. Marshall & Iwamoto, 1973
 Nezumia tinro Sazonov, 1985
 Nezumia toi McCann & D. G. McKnight, 1980
 Nezumia tomiyamai (Okamura, 1963)
 Nezumia umbracincta Iwamoto & M. E. Anderson, 1994
 Nezumia ventralis C. L. Hubbs & Iwamoto, 1979
 Nezumia wularnia Iwamoto & A. Williams, 1999 (Wularni whiptail)

References

Macrouridae
Taxa named by David Starr Jordan
Marine fish genera